Haripad V. Murukadas (Malayalam: ഹരിപ്പാട്  മുരുകദാസ് ) (born 15 May 1971) is an Indian carnatic musician in the wind instrument Nadaswaram. A disciple of  Thiruvizha Jayashankar, he is also a music educator at Kshetra Kala Peetom in Vaikom.

Early life and training 
Born in Haripad, in Alappuzha district of Kerala, Murukadas learned the basics of nadaswaram from Haripad Chellappa Panicker and is now learning and performing under the guidance of Thiruvizha Jayashankar.

Career
He is a graded-artist from All India Radio (AIR) Trivandrum and working as an instructor in Kshetra Kala Peetom, Vaikom. He performs in temple festivals and kutcheris in South Kerala.

Awards and recognition 

 First Prize winner in Kerala School Kalolsavam (School Arts Festival of Kerala) from 1984 to 1986
 First Prize winner in Kerala University Youth Festival from 1987 to 1988

Personal life

References

External links
 Haripad V Murugadas, Discography at Gaana

1971 births
Living people
Nadaswaram players
People from Alappuzha district
Indian music educators